Her Father's House may refer to either:
A 1928 novel by Hilda Vaughan
A 2002 novel by Belva Plain